Monaco is scheduled to compete at the 2019 European Games in Minsk from 21 to 30 June 2019. Monaco is represented by 5 athletes in 4 sports.

Competitors

Boxing

Men

Cycling

Road
Men

Judo

Men

Table tennis

References 

Nations at the 2019 European Games
European Games
2019